Yuki Richard Stalph (born 4 August 1984) is a German-Japanese football manager and former player who works as a head coach for AC Nagano Parceiro.

Career
Stalph was born in Bochum, Germany to a Japanese mother and German father. Two years later, in March 1987, the family moved to Japan.

After graduating from high school in May 2003, Stalph moved to Zürich, Switzerland to kick-off his football career.

Stalph previously played for Hekari United FC and before that he started for the SC Idar-Oberstein and Harrisburg City Islanders.

References

External links

1984 births
Living people
German people of Japanese descent
Sportspeople from Bochum
German footballers
Footballers from North Rhine-Westphalia
Association football midfielders
USL Second Division players
Penn FC players
J3 League managers
YSCC Yokohama managers
AC Nagano Parceiro managers
German football managers
German expatriate footballers
German expatriate sportspeople in the United States
Expatriate soccer players in the United States